Morse is an 'L' station on the CTA's Red Line. It is located at 1358 West Morse Avenue in the Rogers Park neighborhood of Chicago, Illinois. The station was formerly known as Rogers Park or Morse-Rogers Park. There is an entrance/exit on West Morse Avenue, featuring multiple turnstiles, an ATM, and fare machines. There is also an unattended entrance/exit with a single turnstile on Lunt Avenue. Purple Line weekday rush hour express service use the outside tracks but do not stop at this station.

History
The station was first constructed in 1908, and was rebuilt in 1921 as the line was elevated.  This mostly brick and concrete station remains today, although the station was extensively renovated in 2012. The wooden platform was replaced with a new concrete platform, and the interior of the Morse Avenue station house was completely gutted and rebuilt. During this time, the station house was also expanded into an unused adjacent retail space. Shortly after this renovation, an empty storefront adjacent to the Lunt Avenue exit was demolished, and a bicycle parking lot was constructed in its place.

Each year since 2001 the Glenwood Arts Festival has been held on Glenwood Avenue, which includes live music, pop-up art shops, and local food vendors.

Stroller controversy

On November 2, 2009, an incident occurred at the Morse station involving a child in a stroller; the incident is under some dispute.  Ebere Ozonwu claimed that as she was rushing to catch a southbound train, pushing her daughter ahead of her in a stroller, the train's doors closed on the stroller and dragged it, eventually flinging her daughter onto the gravel at the end of the platform and carrying the stroller away.  Traces of paint found on the stroller, possibly from the guardrail at the end of the platform, seemed to confirm this story, but the operator claimed that the doors were carefully checked and the train could not have moved if the doors were not closed.

Location
The Morse station is at the heart of the Rogers Park neighborhood on Chicago's North Side.

Several businesses are housed in the building containing the station. Under the Morse Avenue viaduct are Morse El Liquors and Leni Blumyin.

Many businesses have claimed the corner of the Morse Red Line, Morse Avenue and Glenwood Avenue as home. Pub 626  occupies the northeast corner of Morse and Glenwood. The family-owned Heartland Cafe was located, across the street from the Lunt  Avenue entrance/exit at 7000 North Glenwood Avenue for 42 years until Dec 31, 2018. The building was demolished in May 2019. There are also multiple markets, bodegas, and small corner stores scattered within a half block radius of Morse.

Rogers Park Social  recently moved into a building on Glenwood Avenue.

The Morse station is also walking distance of multiple schools:
 Eugene Field Elementary School  
 George B. Armstrong International Studies  
 Northside Catholic Academy  
 New Field Elementary School  
 Chicago Math and Science Academy 

Many murals have been painted on the sides of the rail line, on Glenwood Avenue, as well as underneath the tracks on Morse and Lunt Avenue, called the Miles of Murals.

Bus connections
CTA
96 Lunt (Weekdays only)
155 Devon

Payment
Transit Cards were initially used as payment, which riders could refill  with money at all transit stops. CTA changed to Ventra Cards on July 1, 2014, as official payment for all transit system.

A one-way trip on the train to any stop, whether it be on the Red Line, or a free transfer to any other conjoined rail line, is $2.50. Transfers within 2 hours are 25 cents. Ventra Cards can be purchased at local drugstores, underneath any train station, and through a credit card which can be used as a venture card, immediately taking money out of a passenger's account when it is tapped on the payment pad before getting on the platform.

Notes and references

Notes

References

External links 

 Train schedule (PDF) at CTA official site
  Morse Station page at Chicago-L.org
 Morse Station page 
 Lunt Avenue entrance from Google Maps Street View
 Morse Avenue entrance from Google Maps Street View
 Ventra Chicago

CTA Red Line stations
Railway stations in the United States opened in 1908
1908 establishments in Illinois